NCM may refer to:

 a non-commissioned member of the Canadian Armed Forces
 the National Cryptologic Museum in the United States
 National CineMedia, an in-theater advertising company
 Navy and Marine Corps Commendation Medal
 Newcrest Mining, ASX trading symbol
 New Communist Movement, US, 1970s and 1980s
 North Cape May, New Jersey
 North Camp railway station, station code
Newton centimetre, N cm or N·cm, subunit of torque